Fudbalski klub Napredak is a football club based in the city of Banatska Topola, Serbia. The name Napredak means "progress" in Serbian. Currently competing in the Kikinda - Žitište Municipal League.

History
Currently the club is one of the oldest clubs in the municipality of Kikinda. Founded, according to some evidence, even the thirties of last century. Since that time the population of the village were mostly ethnic Hungarian club is called 'ELÖRE (FORWARD)' and did not compete, but only played friendly matches with some of the, at that time, the existing clubs in the surrounding areas . The stadium is located across from today's Catholic cemetery. During World War II in the team they played German soldiers, just after the war in the summer of 1946. was formally established football club Napredak.

The first and only leather ball, at the time, brought the Peter Toth, who later was one of the newly established club players.

Initially the club was competing in the so-called Potisje region where the clubs were from the municipality of Kikinda, Ada and Kanjiža. The club has not competed from 1961 to 1963 due to lack of funds. In early seventies the club was competing in the Municipal League Žitište – Nova Crnja. He later went to the reorganization under the auspices of the Football Association Zrenjanjin, where he was until 1992. when the championship was canceled because of war in former Yugoslavia. After one more reorganization, the club was competing in the county league Kikinda – Žitište until 2009.

Now the club competes in, the newly formed, Kikinda - Žitište Municipal League.

The greatest success of the club's place in the Regional League Zrenjanin, 2005/06 season, on his 60th birthday.

In cup competitions on the territory of Kikinda – Novi Bečej, had no significant results.

FK Napredak 2005. for the first time in club history reported a pioneering team to compete in the Kikinda - Novi Bečej Municipal League, in competition, mainly, clubs from Vojvodina League East. The same team has also played a cadet in the Kikinda - Novi Bečej Municipal League. They have played an important role in this competition until the end of 2009/10 season, when the cadets joined the first team.

Recent results

External links 
 the club ID Card on Srbijasport.net
 the club Unofficial website on Mojklub.rs

Football clubs in Serbia
Association football clubs established in 1946
Sport in Kikinda
Football clubs in Yugoslavia
Football clubs in Vojvodina
1946 establishments in Serbia